Peter Orban is a Swedish sprint canoer who competed in the early 1990s. He won two bronze medals in the K-4 10000 m event at the ICF Canoe Sprint World Championships, earning them in 1990 and 1991.

References

Living people
Swedish male canoeists
Year of birth missing (living people)
ICF Canoe Sprint World Championships medalists in kayak